Mike is an unincorporated community in Chariton County, in the U.S. state of Missouri.

The community is on Missouri Route 5 approximately midway between Ketesville to the south and Marceline in adjacent Linn County to the north.

History
A post office called Mike was established in 1890, and remained in operation until 1906. The community most likely has the name of a resident.

References

Unincorporated communities in Chariton County, Missouri
Unincorporated communities in Missouri